The women's 4 × 100 metres relay event at the 1974 British Commonwealth Games was held on 31 January and 2 February at the Queen Elizabeth II Park in Christchurch, New Zealand.

Medalists

Results

Heats
Qualification: First 3 teams of each heat (Q) plus the next 2 fastest (q) qualified for the final.

Final

References

Heats results (The Canberra Times)

Athletics at the 1974 British Commonwealth Games
1974